The women's 63 kg competition of the judo events at the 2011 Pan American Games in Guadalajara, Mexico, was held on October 28 at the CODE II Gymanasium.  The defending champion was Driulys González of Cuba.

Schedule
All times are Central Standard Time (UTC-6).

Results
Legend

1st number = Ippon
2nd number = Waza-ari
3rd number = Yuko

Bracket

Repechage round
Two bronze medals were awarded.

References

External links
 

W63
2011
Pan American Games W63